The French Workers Congress was held in Paris from 2–9 October 1876. It was the first of a series of Congresses which took place following the defeat of the Paris Commune.

References

Labour movement in France